John Weeks  (8 June 1886 – 10 September 1965) was a New Zealand artist who was one of the most influential staff members at the Elam Art School of the University of Auckland, where he taught from 1930 to 1954.

Born in Sydenham Damerel, Devon, England, on 8 June 1886, Weeks came to New Zealand as a child with his parents in 1892. He commenced part-time study at the Elam School of Fine Art  in 1908, with further training at Sydney Technical College just prior to World War I. During the war he served in France with the New Zealand Medical Corps and some small watercolours from this time are held by the Auckland Museum. He broke his arms and one leg. He continued his studies after the war at the Canterbury College School of Art.

From 1923 to 1930 he travelled extensively in Europe, studying intermittently in Edinburgh and at André Lhote's academy, where he was influenced by the cubist movement.

In 1930 Weeks joined the staff at Elam where he was an influential and popular lecturer, representing a more 'modernist' approach than his contemporaries, until his retirement in 1954. In January 1949 much of Weeks' best work was destroyed in a fire at Elam, while he had over 300 of his paintings assembled for selection for a forthcoming exhibition.

In 1953, Weeks was awarded the Queen Elizabeth II Coronation Medal. In 1955, he was the subject of the first solo show at the Auckland City Art Gallery (now the Auckland Art Gallery dedicated to a New Zealand artist. In the 1958 Queen's Birthday Honours, Weeks was appointed an Officer of the Order of the British Empire, for services as an artist.

After Weeks' death on 10 September 1965, around 150 of his works were selected by friends and colleagues for purchase by the Queen Elizabeth II National Trust and sent to several major New Zealand galleries.

References

External links
 Auckland Art Gallery Toi o Tāmaki: Works by John Weeks
 Works in the collection of the Museum of New Zealand Te Papa Tongarewa

1886 births
1965 deaths
Elam Art School alumni
New Zealand Officers of the Order of the British Empire
People from the Borough of West Devon
Academic staff of the University of Auckland
University of Technology Sydney alumni
English emigrants to New Zealand
20th-century New Zealand painters
20th-century New Zealand male artists
People associated with the Rutland Group
University of Auckland alumni